The Albanian Supercup 2014 was the 21st edition of the Albanian Supercup since its establishment in 1989. The match was contested between the 2013–14 Albanian Cup winners KS Flamurtari and the 2013–14 Albanian Superliga champions Skënderbeu Korçë. The cup was won by Skënderbeu Korçë with the minimal score 1–0. This was the second Supercup trophy for Skënderbeu Korçë.

Details

See also
 2013–14 Albanian Superliga
 2013–14 Albanian Cup

References

2014
Supercup
Albanian Supercup, 2014
Albanian Supercup, 2014